Perrysburg is a city located in Wood County, Ohio, United States, along the south side of the Maumee River. The population was 25,041 at the 2020 census. It served as the county seat from 1822 to 1868, and it is still the second-largest city in Wood County. After Bowling Green was designated as county seat, it surpassed Perrysburg in size. 

Perrysburg was surveyed and platted by a federal survey team in summer 1816. A local legend has held that it was designed by noted architect Charles Pierre L'Enfant, after he planned Washington, DC, but this has not been supported by fact.

History

Early history
Perrysburg lies near the center of the Twelve Mile Square Reservation, a tract of land ceded in 1795 to the United States of America by the Odawa people following their defeat in the Northwest Indian Wars. They had occupied this territory since the turn of the 18th century, after having settled in the region of the French trading post at Fort Detroit. Also known as the Ottawa, they had controlled much of the territory along the Maumee River in present-day northwestern Ohio.

In 1810, early European-American settlers here were Major Amos Spafford (1753-1818), his wife Olive (1756-1823), and their four children. In 1796, Spafford, a native of Connecticut, was a surveyor for the Connecticut Land Company. He drew the first map laying out Cleveland and named the city. He left there in 1810 following appointment as US Customs Collector and postmaster for the new port at the Foot of the Rapids of the Miami of the Lake Maumee River.  Two years later, 67 families lived in the area, but most fled at the outbreak of the War of 1812. 

After the war and the 1817 Treaty of Fort Meigs, which extinguished the Ottawa claim to this area, Spafford returned to the area. He settled on a 160-acre land grant, signed by President James Monroe, on River Tract #64 in Waynesfield Township. Other veterans who received land grants for their service during that war also settled in this area.

War of 1812
When the war clouds of 1812 began to edge toward Northwest Ohio, General William Henry Harrison ordered the construction of the fort, beginning in February 1813. Harrison was General Anthony Wayne's former aide-de-camp. Later he was elected as the country's ninth president. The installation was named Fort Meigs in honor of Ohio's fourth governor, Return Jonathan Meigs. Fort Meigs was constructed on a bluff above the Maumee River, and built from a design by army engineer Captain Eleazer D. Wood, for whom the county would be named. Two critical battles with the British were fought at the fort during the War of 1812.

Early settlers in the area fled to Huron during the War of 1812. They returned to settle in the floodplain below Fort Meigs, calling the settlement Orleans. They moved to higher ground after being flooded out. 

Alexander Bourne led a surveying team to plan and plat Perrysburg. He was appointed to that position by Edward Tiffin, Surveyor General of the United States. This survey was performed in late June and early July 1816, by surveyors Joseph Wampler and William Brookfield under the auspices of Bourne and Josiah Meigs, Surveyor General of Ohio, Michigan, Indiana, Illinois, and Missouri.

Some postings on the Internet have claimed that Charles Pierre L'Enfant, noted designer of Washington, DC, had also surveyed and platted Perrysburg, Ohio. Prior to the city's 200th anniversary celebration, the Historical Society hired former engineers to assess this claim. The researchers studied local, state and federal archives, but found no support for this position.

Growth of Perrysburg

The town soon became a center for shipbuilding and commerce on Lake Erie. It was named after Commodore Oliver Hazard Perry, naval commander during the War of 1812 and hero of the Battle of Lake Erie. From 1822 to 1868 Perrysburg served as the county seat.

In 1833, Perrysburg contained a courthouse, jail, schoolhouse, two stores, two taverns, two physicians, two lawyers, about 60 houses, and 250 inhabitants.

In 1854, an epidemic of cholera devastated the population. It had spread with residents and travelers along the waterways because of the lack of adequate sanitation. Perryville closed down for two months in that summer, trying to contain the epidemic at a time when people did not understand how the disease was transmitted. More than 100 people died. Other towns along the Maumee River also suffered high losses from the epidemic. Providence, Ohio was abandoned. It had suffered a disastrous fire less than a decade before.

Modern Perrysburg
On October 12, 1984 President Ronald Reagan made a whistle stop in Perrysburg while traveling in the historic Ferdinand Magellan railroad car. He drew a crowd of over 20,000.

Geography
Contrary to popular opinion and hundreds of historical articles, the 1816 survey of Perrysburg encompassed 1.786 square miles, NOT 1.000 square miles.

Demographics

2010 census
As of the census of 2010, there were 20,623 people, 8,246 households, and 5,504 families living in the city. The racial makeup of the city was 92.9% White, 1.4% African American, 0.1% Native American, 3.1% Asian, 0.8% from other races, and 1.6% from two or more races. Hispanic or Latino of any race were 3.2% of the population.

There were 8,246 households, of which 34.7% had children under the age of 18 living with them, 56.5% were married couples living together, 7.3% had a female householder with no husband present, 2.9% had a male householder with no wife present, and 33.3% were non-families. 28.3% of all households were made up of individuals, and 11% had someone living alone who was 65 years of age or older. The average household size was 2.48 and the average family size was 3.10.

The median age in the city was 38.4 years. 26.5% of residents were under the age of 18; 6.5% were between the ages of 18 and 24; 27.1% were from 25 to 44; 27.6% were from 45 to 64; and 12.3% were 65 years of age or older. The gender makeup of the city was 48.4% male and 51.6% female.

2000 census

As of the census of 2000, there were 16,945 people, 6,592 households, and 4,561 families living in the city. The population density was 1,899.2 people per square mile (733.5/km). There were 6,964 housing units at an average density of 780.5 per square mile (301.4/km). The racial makeup of the city was 95.34% White, 1.03% African American, 0.10% Native American, 1.77% Asian, 0.02% Pacific Islander, 0.90% from other races, and 0.84% from two or more races. Hispanic or Latino of any race were 2.05% of the population.

There were 6,390 households, out of which 38.0% had children under the age of 18 living with them, 61.1% were married couples living together, 6.3% had a female householder with no husband present, and 30.8% were non-families. 27.8% of all households were made up of individuals, and 14.2% had someone living alone who was 65 years of age or older. The average household size was 2.55 and the average family size was 3.18.

In the city the population was spread out, with 29.0% under the age of 18, 5.6% from 18 to 24, 28.3% from 25 to 44, 24.0% from 45 to 64, and 13.0% who were 65 years of age or older. The median age was 38 years. For every 100 females, there were 92.7 males. For every 100 females age 18 and over, there were 86.5 males.

The median income for a household in the city was $62,237 and the median income for a family was $75,651. Males had a median income of $56,496 versus $31,401 for females. The per capita income for the city was $29,652. About 1.5% of families and 2.8% of the population were below the poverty line, including 1.7% of those under age 18 and 8.1% of those age 65 or over.

Education

Perrysburg is home to The Islamic School of Greater Toledo, Saint Rose School and Perrysburg Schools, which includes a preschool, four elementary schools, one intermediate school, one junior high school and Perrysburg High School. 

In the year 2016, 51% of Perrysburg residents over the age of 25 had a bachelor's degree or a higher level of education, compared to 31.7% of Wood County residents, 23% of residents in the Toledo MSA, 26.7% of Ohioans, and 30.3% in the U.S.

Library
The Way Public Library serves Perrysburg area. In 2016, the library loaned 639,113 items and provided 726 programs to its 34,336 registered borrowers. Total holdings in 2016 were 93,416 print materials and 182 print subscriptions.

Notable people

 Burke Badenhop, professional baseball pitcher in Major League Baseball
 Clara Blinn, pioneer who died in the aftermath of the Battle of Washita River
 Douglas Brinkley, award-winning historian, lived in Perrysburg from 1968 to 1982
 Bil Dwyer, cartoonist (Dumb Dora) and humorist
 T. J. Fatinikun, professional football player in the National Football League (NFL) and Arena Football League
 Jerry Glanville, NFL and college football head coach
 Jim Harbaugh, professional football player in the NFL and head coach in the NFL and college football
 John Harbaugh, head coach in the National Football League (NFL)
 Sam Jaeger, actor and screenwriter
 Ralph Wesley Judd, professional baseball player in Major League Baseball
 Lance K. Landrum, United States Air Force lieutenant general currently serving as the 23rd Deputy Chair of the NATO Military Committee
 Jim Leyland, professional baseball player and manager in Major League Baseball
 Anna Tunnicliffe, 2008 US Olympic Sailing Team gold medalist

Notable companies

 Burkett Restaurant Equipment, dealer in food service equipment
 Owens-Illinois Inc., global glass container manufacturer
 Universal Tube & Rollform Equipment, metalworking machinery dealer, specializing in tube mills, roll forming and coil processing equipment.
 Fox Software, creator of FoxPro (Defunct after being acquired by Microsoft in 1992)
 First Solar, a global provider of comprehensive PV solar solutions that use its advanced module and system technology.

References

External links/ Further reading

 
 Franks, Gary L. The Founding and Survey of Perrysburg, Ohio; Collierville TN: InstantPublisher.com, 2018</ref>

Perrysburg, Ohio
1816 establishments in Ohio
Cities in Wood County, Ohio
Populated places established in 1816
Cities in Ohio